The National Maps of Switzerland, also referred to as the Swisstopo maps, are a set of official map series designed, edited and distributed by Swisstopo, the Swiss Federal Office of Topography.  Each map series is based on an oblique, conformal, cylindrical projection (Mercator projection), with a Swiss Coordinate system (CH1903 +). All maps are updated in a complete cycle of about six years.

In 1938, the Federal Office of Topography started issuing new map sheets, which were intended to succeed the old Dufour and Siegfried Maps. They first appeared in 1:50,000 scale, and from 1952 also in 1:25,000 scale. In addition, further generalisations were made in smaller scales. In each scale, the whole of Switzerland was covered. In 1979, with the issuance of the last 1:25,000 scale sheet, the work was completed.

The map sheets have been produced in several different versions: topographic maps, tourist maps, special maps (for aerospace, geology, etc.). They are now also available on electronic media.  The topographic maps have been published in the following scale series:

The normal map sheets are arranged in a grid pattern. In addition, there are composition maps (i.e. extending over sheet borders) covering urban agglomerations, or tourist areas. Many of 1:50,000 scale map sheets are also available as hiking maps (with highlighted trails) or as ski tour maps.

The Federal Office of Topography also publishes the following digital products:

National Map 1:25,000 on DVD (Swiss Map 25);
National Map 1:50,000 on DVD (Swiss Map 50);
National Map 1:100,000 on CD-ROM (Swiss Map 100); and
For professional applications:
Digital landscape models as pixel maps for all scales;
Digital landscape models as vector data based on the 1:25,000 (VECTOR25) and 1:200,000 (VECTOR200) topographic map sheets; and

For all of these maps, the Pierres du Niton rocks, in the port of Geneva, are the reference point for height measurements.

In 2005, a proposal for the spelling of local names (field names) on the national map in a manner closer to the way in which they are pronounced was made available for the formal Swiss consultation process.  Many national map users are opposed to this proposal.

References

External links

map.geo.admin.ch - Geographical portal of the Swiss Confederation

Map series
Map series of Switzerland